Brigadier General Harold Francis Loomis (19 June 1890 – 21 October 1970) was a United States Army officer who served in both World War I and World War II. A graduate of the United States Military Academy at West Point, New York, he was ranked 50th in the class of 1914. During World War II he was in charge of the French rearmament program in the North African Theater of Operations (NATOUSA) and later at Supreme Headquarters Allied Expeditionary Force (SHAEF). The French units he helped re-equip played an important role in the Italian and the Southern France campaigns.

Early life

Harold Francis Loomis was born in Rockville, Connecticut, on 19 June 1890. On 1 March 1910, he entered the United States Military Academy at West Point, New York, where he acquired the nickname "Loomy". He graduated on 12 June 1914, and was commissioned as a second lieutenant in the Coast Artillery Corps on 8 July 1914. His fellow graduates included future general officers such as Carl Spaatz, Brehon B. Somervell, Harold R. Bull, John B. Anderson, Jens A. Doe, James L. Bradley, Frank W. Milburn, Ralph Royce, Orlando Ward, Charles P. Gross, Vicente Lim, and Harry C. Ingles.

World War I 
Loomis's first assignment was in Paris, France, as an assistant to US military attaché there from 8 August to 8 September 1914, the outbreak of World War I. On returning to the United States he was assigned to Fort Monroe, Virginia. He married Elizabeth Kimberly in September 1915; they had no children. He was then posted to Fort Ruger in the Territory of Hawaii, where he was promoted to  first lieutenant on 1 July 1916 and captain on 1 July 1917, and served as aide-de-camp to Brigadier Generals Charles Treat and John Philip Wisser, the commanders of the Hawaiian Department.

In April 1918, Loomis returned to United States, where he commanded a company at Fort Monroe, and then became an instructor in administration and military law at the Coast Artillery School there. He was promoted to major on 10 September 1918 and lieutenant colonel on 19 October 1918. He was the director of the non-commissioned officers school at the Coast Artillery School from 8 April 1919 to 11 June 1919. He served briefly with the American Expeditionary Forces in France until 6 October 1919, and then returned to the Coast Artillery School as an instructor.

Between the wars
Loomis reverted to his substantive rank of captain on 11 February 1920, but was promoted to major again on 1 July. From 24 August 1920 to 1 July 1924 he was an instructor in modern languages at West Point. He attended the Advanced Course at the Coast Artillery School from 15 September 1924 to 15 June 1925, and served with the 7th Coast Artillery from 17 June 1925 until 1 August 1927.

After attending the Command and General Staff School at Fort Leavenworth, Kansas, from 24 August 1927 to 15 June 1928, Loomis he returned to the Coast Artillery School as an instructor in tactics. From 30 June 1932 to 17 October 1934 he was a student at the École supérieure de guerre in Paris. He served with the 62nd Coast Artillery at Fort Totten, New York, where he was promoted to lieutenant colonel on 1 September 1935, and then with the 2nd Coast Artillery. From 1 August 1938 to 30 June 1939 he attended the Army War College at Fort Humphreys, DC.

World War II
Now qualified as a general staff officer, Loomis was assigned to the War Plans Division of the War Department General Staff in Washington, DC. In this role he surveyed the coastal defences of the western hemisphere and chose sites for coastal defence guns. He was promoted to colonel  on 1 July 1941 and brigadier general on 5 November. On 22 November he assumed command of the Harbor Defenses of Portland. On 17 May 1942, he moved to Jacksonville, Florida, as the commanding general of the Southern Sector of the Eastern Defense Command.

On 10 October 1943, Loomis became the chairman of the Joint Rearmament Commission (JRC) in the  North African Theater of Operations (NATOUSA). As such, he was responsible for the rearmament of French Army units to enable them to participate in subsequent campaigns. There were doubts at the War Department about the reliability and efficiency of the French forces, but Loomis resisted proposals to equip them with cast off World War I-era weapons, and insisted on their being equipped to the same standard as American units. At the same time, he struggled to persuade the French to cut back on combat units, and form a balanced force with sufficient logistical units to support itself. In the latter he was less successful than he hoped, for despite frantic efforts, the French were unable to find sufficient skilled personnel. However, the exemplary performance of the French Expeditionary Corps in the Italian campaign amply vindicated Loomis's faith in the French Army and the rearmament program.

For his services in NATOUSA, Loomis was awarded the  Distinguished Service Medal. His citation read:

After the successful Allied invasion of Southern France, in which rearmed French Army units participated, the rearmament program officially ended, and the JRC was disbanded. Loomis moved to Paris, where he joined the Supreme Headquarters Allied Expeditionary Force (SHAEF) as the head of its Rearmament Division.  He was able to establish an excellent working relationship with the reconstituted French General Staff, particularly Colonel , who had been a classmate at the École supérieure de guerre. Loomis was subsequently awarded the Legion of Merit for his service at SHAEF.

Post-war

After the war, Loomis was chief of the Budget and Fiscal Section at Army Ground Forces headquarters from 15 October 45 until June 1946, for which he received the Commendation Ribbon. In addition to his American decorations, he was awarded the French Croix de Guerre with palm, and made an honorary Commander of the Order of the British Empire, Officer of the Legion of Honor and  Grand Officer of the Tunisian Order of Nichan-Iftikar.

Loomis retired from the Army with the rank of brigadier general on 30 November 1946. In retirement he was the director of American Aid to France, Inc. Loomis lived in Washington, D.C. with his wife Elizabeth "Bessie" (Kimberly) Loomis. He died on 21 October 1970 of a cerebral hemorrhage at the Walter Reed  Medical Center and was interred in West Point Cemetery.

Dates of rank

References

Bibliography

External links
Generals of World War II

1890 births
1970 deaths
People from Rockville, Connecticut
United States Military Academy alumni
Military personnel from Connecticut
United States Army Coast Artillery Corps personnel
United States Army personnel of World War I
United States Military Academy faculty
United States Army Command and General Staff College alumni
United States Army War College alumni
United States Army generals of World War II
Recipients of the Distinguished Service Medal (US Army)
Recipients of the Legion of Merit
Honorary Commanders of the Order of the British Empire
United States Army generals
Military personnel from Washington, D.C.
Burials at West Point Cemetery